Lal Lal Lal is a Finnish record label run by Roope Eronen, Arttu Partinen and Kevin Regan, specialized in psychedelic folk and similar genres, and has gained a cult reputation around the world. The Wire magazine has given their releases favourable reviews.

Discography
 Avarus: Possum Ekor Kait Dataran
 Avarus: Horuksen keskimmäisen silmän mysteerikoulu
 Kemialliset Ystävät: Varisevien tanssi / Silmujen marssi
 Neil Campbell: Sol Powr
 Sipriina: Pianon äärellä
 V/A: Kuolleena haudattuja
 The Anaksimandros: Camels running through life
 Toni Laakso
 Munuaissymposium 1960 / Maniacs Dream
 Kukkiva Poliisi / Avarus: Maximum Highway Lifestyle
 keijo
 Master Qsh
 Maniacs Dream
 Rauhan Orkesteri
 The Demars: Veriläiskiä
 Avarus: Kimi on Tintti
 Avarus: Jättiläisrotta
 Hall of Fame: Cannibal / Superstring Theory
 Kompleksi: (I Ain't No) Lovechild / Moscow 1980
 Paavi
 Fricara Pacchu: Waydom
 MWM / Maryfist
 The Skaters: Crowned Purple Gowns
 Buffle : Constrictor
 The Ray Pacino Ensemble : Be My Lonely Night
 Armas Huutamo: Aurinko on kaunis Asia
 Javelin: Oh Centra. Album art by Joe Grillo of the art collective Dearraindrop
 Avarus: Vesikansi
 Fricara Pacchu: Space Puppet
 Maniacs Dream: Zanzibar
 Renegade Scanners: Hands on Future
 The Ray Pacino Ensemble: Be My Lonely Night / Golden Greats
 Nuslux
 V/A: Lal Lal Lal Festival
 Semimuumio : Vamos
 Maniacs Dream : Turku Hold'Em
 Howlin' Magic : The Dreaming
 Fricara Pacchu : Midnight pyre
 V/A: Feeling strong!
 V/A: Lal Lal Lal Festival 2
 Good Band
 Puke Eaters : Hello Valhalla
 V/A : Lal Lal Lal Festival 3
 V/A : Lal Lal Lal Festival 4
 Avarus : Live
 V/A : Tour tape 2011

References

External links
 Lal Lal Lal

Finnish record labels